The Recreational Demonstration Area program (also known as the Recreation Demonstration Area program) was a National Park Service program during the 1930s and early 1940s that built forty-six public parks in twenty-four states on , chiefly near urban areas in the United States. The NPS used labor from a variety of Great Depression federal relief programs, chiefly the Civilian Conservation Corps and Works Progress Administration, to build recreational demonstration areas. By the end of World War II, the recreational demonstration areas had all either become National Park Service units or been given to their states for use as state parks.

The goals of the Recreation Demonstration Area program were typically threefold: 1) to develop land as a park; 2) to provide employment; and 3) to create new parks near urban areas. For the first goal, in some cases the land developed was purchased from sub-optimal farmers, providing some of the poorest farmers with relief. In other cases, state lands (in state forests or parks) were developed. In the second case, the CCC and WPA laborers received payment, and in the CCC, room and board. Finally, the residents of nearby urban areas benefited from new nearby recreation areas.

List
The following is a list of the forty six former recreational demonstration areas.

History
There are five former recreational demonstration areas in Pennsylvania, which became part of one unit of the National Park Service, and five state parks in 1945 and 1946. There are five former recreational demonstration areas in Virginia, four of which are now part of the National Park Service. Two recreational demonstration areas were built in Missouri and are now state parks. There are three former recreational demonstration areas in Tennessee, all are now state parks.

References

New Deal agencies
Nature conservation in the United States
Civilian Conservation Corps
Works Progress Administration